The Army Headquarters (Army HQ) is the headquarters of the Sri Lanka Army and is located in the Defence Headquarters Complex in Sri Jayawardenapura Kotte. It was established on 1 October 1949 in the Echelon Barracks which was the headquarters of the British Army in Ceylon. It later moved to the Rifle Barracks and then to the Old Army Headquarters Complex, before moving to the new Defence Headquarters Complex.

Structure 
The Sri Lanka Army is commanded by the Commander of the Army. Reporting to the Commander of the Army, are the Chief of Staff of the Sri Lanka Army, the Deputy Chief of Staff and the Commandant of the Volunteer Force. The Army Headquarters is divided into several branches, namely the General Staff (GS) branch, Adjutant General's (AGs) branch, Quarter Master General's (QMGs) branch, Master General of Ordnance's (MGOs) branch and the Military Secretary's branch. Security to the headquarters is provided by the Commander's Security Unit, which is traditionally drawn from the parent battalion of the Commander of the Army which is currently the 1st Battalion, Gajaba Regiment.

Units 
 Chief Field Engineer HQ
 Chief Signal Officer HQ
 Independent Brigade HQ
 Army Headquarter Battalion
 Corps of Drums of Army HQ
 Senior Security Coordinating Office
 Colombo Military Hospital
 Ranaviru Seva Authority
 Commander Security Unit
 Army HQ Provost Company
 Army HQ Bomb Disposal Unit

See also
 Office of the Chief of Defence Staff
 Air Headquarters (Sri Lanka Air Force)
 Naval Headquarters (Sri Lanka Navy)
 Sri Lankan Armed Forces

References 

HQ
Commands of the Sri Lanka Army
Sri Jayawardenepura Kotte
1959 establishments in Ceylon
Military headquarters in Sri Lanka
Sri Lanka